This England is a 1941 British historical drama film directed by David MacDonald and starring John Clements, Constance Cummings and Emlyn Williams. The film follows the small English village of Cleveley and its historic resistance against tyrannical invaders recounted by one of the inhabitants to a visiting American journalist.

Production
The film was made for propaganda purposes during the Second World War. Its title comes from a speech by John of Gaunt in the play Richard II by William Shakespeare.

Partial cast
John Clements - John Rookeby
Constance Cummings - Ann
Emlyn Williams - Appleyard
Frank Pettingell - Gage
Roland Culver - Steward
Morland Graham -  Doctor
Leslie French - Johnny
Martin Walker -  Seigneur
Ronald Ward - Lord Clavely
Hugh Wakefield - Vicar
Esmond Knight - Vicar's son
Amy Veness - Jenny
Roddy McDowall - Hugo
Dennis Wyndham - Martin

References

External links

1941 films
Films directed by David MacDonald (director)
1940s historical drama films
British historical drama films
Films scored by Richard Addinsell
British black-and-white films
1941 drama films
Films shot at British National Studios
1940s English-language films
1940s British films